Cambodia competed at the 2014 Summer Youth Olympics, in Nanjing, China from 16 August to 28 August 2014.

Athletics

Cambodia qualified one athlete.

Qualification Legend: Q=Final A (medal); qB=Final B (non-medal); qC=Final C (non-medal); qD=Final D (non-medal); qE=Final E (non-medal)

Girls
Track & road events

Swimming

Cambodia qualified one swimmer.

Boys

Wrestling

Cambodia was given an invitation to compete from the Tripartite Commission.

Girls

References

2014 in Cambodian sport
Nations at the 2014 Summer Youth Olympics
Cambodia at the Youth Olympics